Riverfront Stadium was a multi-purpose stadium in Cincinnati, Ohio, U.S. (demolished in 2002)

Riverfront Stadium may also refer to:

 Bears & Eagles Riverfront Stadium, Newark, New Jersey (demolished in 2019)
 Riverfront Stadium (Waterloo), Waterloo, Iowa
 Riverfront Stadium (Wichita), Wichita, Kansas